Steve Lawler may refer to:
 Steve Lawler (DJ)
 Steve Lawler (wrestler)